Battle of Pharsalus or Pharsala/Farsala can refer to:

 Battle of Pharsalus, one of the decisive battles of the Roman civil wars, fought in 48 BC between the forces of Julius Caesar and Pompey
 Battle of Pharsalus (1277), between a Byzantine army and the forces of the ruler of Thessaly, John Doukas
 , between the Greeks and the Ottomans in the Greco-Turkish War of 1897